The  was a  rocket used by the Imperial Japanese Army in the final stages of World War II.

Development and design
The Type 4 rocket mortar was developed in the final stages of World War II by the Imperial Japanese Army Technical Bureau, as a relatively low-cost, easy to produce weapon, which had an advantage of greater accuracy over conventional mortars in that it fired a spin-stabilized projectile. The first units were deployed in 1943, and were used in limited numbers in combat during the Battle of Iwo Jima and Battle of Okinawa. Due to its ease of construction, it was produced in limited numbers and distributed to hidden arsenals for use as last-ditch weapons during the projected Allied invasion of the Japanese home islands.

Unlike the Type 4 20 cm rocket, which could be launched from an ordinary pipe or culvert with sufficient diameter, wooden rails, or even directly from a slope in the ground, the Type 4 40 cm rocket required specially designed launch rails.

References
 Bishop, Chris (eds) The Encyclopedia of Weapons of World War II. Barnes & Nobel. 1998. 
 Chamberlain, Peter and Gander, Terry. Heavy Field Artillery. Macdonald and Jane's (1975). 
 McLean, Donald B. Japanese Artillery; Weapons and Tactics. Wickenburg, Ariz.: Normount Technical Publications 1973. .
 US Department of War, TM 30-480, Handbook on Japanese Military Forces, Louisiana State University Press, 1994.

External links
 Type 4 on Taki's Imperial Japanese Army page

Notes

4
Rocket artillery
400 mm artillery
Weapons and ammunition introduced in 1943